Weststar GK-M1 is a Malaysian military light utility vehicle or light tactical vehicle designed and manufactured by Weststar Defence Industries.

History

Weststar delivered an unknown quantity of the GK-M1 in 2015. On April 20, 2016, Weststar received another contract from the Malaysian Armed Forces to equip them with 44 Weststar GK-M1 Rapid Rover vehicles. An additional 44 were also to be ordered.

During the Defence & Security Exhibition 2015 convention, Thales announced that it had signed a contract to supply the Malaysian Armed Forces with ForceSHIELD anti-air defense system which is consist of Starstreak missiles, Control Master 200 radar and weapon control system. This system will be install on Weststar GK-M1.

Design
The GK-M1 is outfitted with a Toyota engine.

Variants

Fitted For Radio
Command and communication vehicle to accommodate communications equipment.

Ambulance
Ambulance vehicle with accommodation of stretchers in the rear compartment.

Special Operation Vehicle
An off-road vehicle for special forces units made with COTS parts, unveiled in Defence Service Asia 2016. Offered to the Grup Gerak Khas under the light strike vehicle procurement program.

Weapon Carrier
A variant equipped with weapons on top of the vehicle. Weapons mounted include the M134D-H minigun.

Air Defence
Air defence variant equipped with Starstreak surface-to-air missiles. They're installed through a Lightweight Multiple Launcher (LML).

Operators

 : 100+ GK-M1s reported in service with the Malaysian Army as of 2020.

See also
 Cendana Auto Rover

Similar vehicles
 Pindad Maung, Indonesian military light vehicle
 Indonesian Light Strike Vehicle, Indonesian military light vehicle
 Humvee, US military light vehicle
 Dongfeng EQ2050, Chinese military vehicle

References

Military light utility vehicles
Armoured fighting vehicles of Malaysia
Military vehicles of Malaysia
Off-road vehicles
Military vehicles introduced in the 2010s